The Democratic Party was a political party in the Philippines in 1953 to 1957. The party was not related to the Democratic Party of the United States, Democrata Party, and Democratic Party of the Philippines.

The party fielded candidates for the 1953 general election, however, its presidential candidate Carlos P. Romulo withdrew. After Romulo withdrew, his running mate Fernando Lopez also withdrew to run in the Senate election instead. Lopez and Ruperto Kangleon both won in the senatorial election, with Lopez topping the race.

The Democrats would later merge into the Nacionalista Party.

Electoral performance
The party participated in the 1953 and 1955 elections.

Senate

House of Representatives
*Two of the seats were from a common Nacionalista Party-Democratic Party ticket.

References

Defunct political parties in the Philippines
1953 establishments in the Philippines